This List of Houston Cougars head football coaches includes those coaches who have led the Houston Cougars football team that represents the University of Houston in the sport of American football.  The Houston Cougars currently compete in the Division I Football Bowl Subdivision (FBS) of the National Collegiate Athletic Association (NCAA) and have been members of the American Athletic Conference since the 2013 season.  Seventeen men have served as the Cougars' head coach, including two who served as interim head coaches, since the Cougars began play in the fall of 1946.  Dana Holgorsen was named head coach on January 1, 2019.

Key

Coaches 
Note: Through 2022 season.

Remark: Not included in the above listing is Todd Orlando, who was designated interim head coach for a brief period in 2016 but did not coach any games.

See also 

 List of College Football Hall of Fame inductees (coaches)

Notes

References

External links 
  Houston Coaching Records – Win–loss records of Houston Cougars head coaches at College Football Data Warehouse

Lists of college football head coaches

Texas sports-related lists
Houston-related lists